Adventures in Flesh is a text adventure for the Apple II written by Fred D. Williams and published in 1983 by Krell Software. The player is shrunken and placed inside the body of a patient with multiple illnesses, which they must diagnose in order to score points.

Gameplay

Adventures in Flesh is a text adventure in which the player character is miniaturized and injected into the body of a patient with up to ten disorders. Using the game's manual, a coloring book of human anatomy, the player then must navigate their way through the body to diagnose the patient based on clues and symptoms found in each area of the body, and they score points based on the amount of correct diagnoses. The program has a vocabulary of about 100 words; commands are mostly one or two words long, and the program prompts the player with available commands based on the area they are in at each turn.

Reception
In a review for Computer Gaming World, J. Robert Beck stated that adults would consider the game "engaging, if unsophisticated compared to the best prose adventures", adding, "Its shortcomings as an adventure program are well offset by its attention to anatomic detail and informative approach to a score of real medical problems." In her book Ace it!: Use Your Computer to Improve Your Grades, Kendra Bonnett wrote that the game had "interesting, sometimes funny, and always educational" responses, detail-rich descriptions, and "well done" documentation, though she added that the game's vocabulary "ideally should have been longer."

References

External links
 

1980s interactive fiction
1983 video games
Adventure games
Apple II games
Apple II-only games
Human body in popular culture
Krell Software games
Medical video games
Single-player video games
Video games about microbes
Video games about size change
Video games developed in the United States